This is a list of rivers of Jamaica, arranged from west to east, with respective tributaries indented under each larger stream's name.

North Coast

South Negril River
Unnamed
Middle River
Unnamed
Unnamed
North Negril River
Orange River
Unnamed
New Found River
Cave River
Fish River
Green Island River
Lucea West River
Lucea East River
Flint River
Great River
Montego River
Martha Brae River
Rio Bueno
Cave River (underground connection)
Roaring River
Llandovery River
Dunn River
White River
Rio Nuevo
Oracabessa River
Port Maria River
Pagee
Wag Water River (Agua Alta)
Flint River
Annotto River
Dry River
Buff Bay River
Spanish River
Swift River
Rio Grande
Black River
Stony River
Guava River
Plantain Garden River

South Coast

New Savannah River
Cabarita River
Thicket River
Morgans River
Sweet River
Black River
Broad River
Y.S. River
Smith River 
One Eye River (underground connection)
Hectors River (underground connection)
Alligator Hole River
Gut River
Milk River
Rio Minho
Salt River
Coleburns Gully
Rio Cobre
Rio Pedro
Rio Doro
Rio Magno
Ferry River
Hope River
Cane River
Yallahs River
Morant River
Negro River

See also 
 Water resources management in Jamaica

References
General
, GEOnet Names Server
OMC Map
CIA Map
Ford, Jos C. and Finlay, A.A.C. (1908).The Handbook of Jamaica. Jamaica Government Printing Office

Inline

Jamaica
Rivers of Jamaica
Jam